Belmonte de Gracián (Aragonese: Belmón de Grazián) is a village near Calatayud in the province of Zaragoza in Aragon, Spain. It is fortified village which sits at the foot of a 15th-century castle.

It is the birthplace of Baltasar Gracián y Morales.

The archaeological remains of the Celtiberian and Romano-Celtiberian town of Segeda-Sekeiza are located between Belmonte de Gracián and the nearby town of Mara.

Main sights
Castle, with an oval plan
Church of St. Michael (15th century), in Gothic style. It has a Mudéjar bell tower.
Hermitage of the Castle
Watch Tower  (10th century)
Fortified Palace (14th century)

References 

Municipalities in the Province of Zaragoza